Mathieson is a surname and may apply to the following:

Alexander Mathieson & Sons, Scottish edge-tool makers
Bonnie Mathieson (1945-2018), American scientist
Colin Mathieson, Paralympic athlete from Canada
Craig Mathieson (b. 1971), Australian writer
David Mathieson (b. 1978), Scottish footballer
 James Mathieson (1905–1950), Scottish football goalkeeper
Jamie Mathieson, British writer
Jean Mathieson, Canadian animator
Jim Mathieson (footballer) (1892–1982), Australian rules footballer
Jim Mathieson (ice hockey) (born 1970), Canadian ice hockey player
Jim Mathieson (sculptor) (1931–2003), British sculptor
John Mathieson (cinematographer) (b. 1958), film maker
John Mathieson (computer scientist), computer scientist who worked for Sinclair Research and later developed the Atari Jaguar video games console
John Alexander Mathieson (1863–1947), Premier of the Canadian province of Prince Edward Island 1911–1917
Muir Mathieson (1911-1975), British conductor
Neil Mathieson (1823- ), Scottish chemist and businessman
Peter Mathieson (b. 1959), British nephrologist
Peter Mathieson, New Zealand swimmer
Rhys Mathieson (born 1997), Australian rules footballer
Scott Mathieson (b. 1984), Canadian baseball player
Taso Mathieson (1908-1991), Scottish racing driver
Willie Mathieson, Scottish footballer

It is also very rarely used as a given name:

Mathieson Jacoby (1869–1915), Australian politician

See also
Matheson (surname)

Patronymic surnames
Surnames from given names